The usage of the title Golden Book includes:

 Golden Books was the children's book imprint of Western Publishing, later Golden Books Publishing and now Random House/Penguin Random House
 Little Golden Books and Giant Golden Books children's series
 Golden Book Encyclopedia
 The Golden Book Magazine, a magazine publishing short fiction that ran from 1925 to 1939
 Codex Aureus (Latin for Golden Book) are several Gospel books from the 9th through 11th centuries that were heavily illuminated with gold leaf
 Libro d'Oro is the official register of the Kingdom of Italy, compiled by consulting heraldry
 The Golden Boke of Marcus Aurelius Emperour and Eloquent Oratour (1535), by Antonio de Guevara, translated by Lord Berners
 The Golden Book of Cycling was created in 1932 to celebrate "the Sport and Pastime of Cycling by recording outstanding rides, deeds and accomplishments"

See also
 Golden Brooks